The Western Cape Provincial Parliament (WCPP) is the legislature of the Western Cape province of South Africa. It is located at 7 Wale Street in Cape Town.

The Provincial Parliament, along with the other provincial legislatures of South Africa, exists by virtue of Chapter 6 of the Constitution of South Africa and Chapter 3 of the Constitution of the Western Cape. It is unicameral, and consists of 42 members elected by a system of party-list proportional representation.

The Western Cape is unique amongst the provinces of South Africa in calling its legislature the "Provincial Parliament" and the members Members of Provincial Parliament (MPPs). The other provinces use the terms "Provincial Legislature" and "Members of the Provincial Legislature".

The Sixth Provincial Parliament was elected on 8 May 2019 in South Africa's 2019 general elections. A majority of the members belong to the Democratic Alliance.

Powers

The Provincial Parliament is modelled on the Westminster system. The executive head of the provincial government, the Premier of the Western Cape, is elected by the Members of the Provincial Parliament from amongst themselves; conventionally the Premier will be the leader of the largest party in the parliament. The Premier then chooses the members of the Provincial Cabinet, who must also be MPPs. The Provincial Parliament also has the power to force the Premier and Cabinet to resign, by passing a motion of no confidence.

The legislative power of the Provincial Parliament is restricted to certain fields enumerated in the national Constitution; in some of these fields, the power is shared with the national Parliament. The fields on which the Provincial Parliament may legislate include health care, primary and secondary education, agriculture, transport, and land use planning. It also controls the budget of the provincial government departments.

Legislation may be introduced by any member, except for money bills, which may be introduced only by the Provincial Minister of Finance. Laws passed by the Provincial Parliament must be signed by the Premier before coming into effect. The Premier may refer a bill back to Parliament for reconsideration if she or he believes it is unconstitutional. If the Parliament re-passes it, then the Premier must either sign it or refer it to the Constitutional Court, which can make a final decision on its constitutionality.

Election 

The provincial legislature consists of 42 members, who are elected through a system of party list proportional representation with closed lists. In other words, each voter casts a vote for one political party, and seats in the legislature are allocated to the parties in proportion to the number of votes received. The seats are then filled by members in accordance with lists submitted by the parties before the election.

The legislature is elected for a term of five years unless it is dissolved early. This may occur if the legislature votes to dissolve and it is at least three years since the last election, or if the Premiership falls vacant and the legislature fails to elect a new Premier within ninety days. By convention, all nine provincial legislatures and the National Assembly are elected on the same day.

The most recent election was held on 8 May 2019. The following table summarizes the results.

The following table shows the composition of the provincial parliament after past elections and floor-crossing periods.

Officers
The presiding officer of the Provincial Parliament is the Speaker, assisted by a Deputy Speaker. The Speaker position is currently held by Daylin Mitchell of the Democratic Alliance, while the Deputy Speaker is Beverley Schäfer also of the DA.

Apart from being the executive head of the province, the Premier also leads the governing party or coalition in the Provincial Parliament. The leader of the largest party not in government is recognised as Leader of the Opposition.  the Premier is Alan Winde of the Democratic Alliance. Cameron Dugmore of the African National Congress is Leader of the Opposition since 2019, after Khaya Magaxa was elected to the National Assembly of South Africa.

List of speakers

List of opposition leaders

Expansion
In February 2020, the ruling Democratic Alliance proposed increasing the number of the seats in the Provincial Parliament to between 52 and 60 seats. The proposal is supported by the African National Congress, yet it has also been denounced by Good.

See also
 Provincial legislature (South Africa)
 List of Members of the Western Cape Provincial Parliament
 List of Acts of the Western Cape Provincial Parliament

References

External links
 WCPP official website

 
Parliament
Provincial legislatures of South Africa
Unicameral legislatures